Zero Days is the twelfth studio album by American heavy metal band Prong. It was released on July 28, 2017 through Steamhammer/SPV record label. The record was produced by the band's guitarist/vocalist Tommy Victor and longtime collaborator Chris Collier, the latter of whom provided the engineering.

Critical reception

Writing for Blabbermouth.net, Ray Van Horn Jr. stated: "As ever, Victor tinkers with the core sound by tapping into agro metal, hardcore, anthem rock and industrial while remaining true to the marching crunch and thrash that go into a Prong record." Invisible Oranges critic Tom Campagna described the record as "a solid thrash-heavy album with tendencies leaning toward the band's salad days of industrial music." Emma Johnston of Louder Sound regarded the record as a "focused and determined work with a fiery heart," further stating that "this old dog has plenty of bite left in it." Loudwire's Michael Christopher noted that "Tommy Victor has shown that not only is he a major fan of metal in general, but he's got ideas and excitement to share."

Track listing
All tracks written by Prong.
 "However It May End" — 3:36
 "Zero Days" — 3:35
 "Off the Grid" — 3:18
 "Divide and Conquer" — 3:17
 "Forced into Tolerance" — 3:17
 "Interbeing" — 3:50
 "Blood Out of Stone" — 4:12
 "Operation of the Moral Law" — 3:31
 "The Whispers" — 3:20
 "Self Righteous Indignation" — 4:14
 "Rulers of the Collective" — 3:02
 "Compulsive Future Projection" — 3:10
 "Wasting of the Dawn" — 4:39
 "Reasons to Be Fearful" (bonus track) — 3:31

Personnel
Album personnel as adapted from the liner notes.

Prong
 Tommy Victor — guitars, vocals
 Mike Longworth — bass
 Art Cruz — drums

Additional personnel
 Tommy Victor — production
 Chris Collier — production, engineering, mixing, mastering choir vocals
 Matt Williams — additional backing vocals, choir vocals
 Greg Harrison — guitar solo on "Zero Days"
 Chris Canella — guitar solo on "Interbeing"
 Marzi Montazeri — guitar solo on "Operation of the Moral Law"
 Fred Ziomek — additional guitars on "Rulers of the Collective"
 Jason Williams — choir vocals
 Steve Hernandez — choir vocals
 Justin "Rodan" Manning — choir vocals
 Sebastian Rohde — artwork
 Firma Freimauer — artwork

Chart positions

References

External links
 

2017 albums
Prong (band) albums
Albums produced by Tommy Victor
SPV GmbH albums
Steamhammer Records albums